Stalicoolithus is an oogenus of dinosaur egg from the Sanshui and Chichengshan Formations of the Tiantai Basin in Zhejiang Province. It is known from a single, complete fossil egg, notable for its spherical shape.

See also 
 List of dinosaur oogenera

References 

Stalicoolithids
Cenomanian life
Coniacian life
Santonian life
Turonian life
Dinosaur reproduction
Cretaceous China
Fossils of China
Fossil parataxa described in 2012